Nagarahalli is a village in Dharwad district of Karnataka, India.

Demographics 
As of the 2011 Census of India there were 277 households in Nagarahalli and a total population of 1,391 consisting of 751 males and 640 females. There were 148 children ages 0-6.

References

Villages in Dharwad district